RighTel (Raitel) is the third mobile phone network operator of Iran. RighTel is the first 3G mobile operator in Iran, providing 3.75G mobile telecommunication services to individuals and businesses.

Established by the Social Security Organization, in late 2011 and started its expansion and launch of services in 2012. Rightel is fully owned by the investment company of the Social Security Organization. RighTel has approximately 5 percent of the mobile subscribers in Iran and has covered the whole country mostly with 3G technology by 2017 but struggled ever since to increase its market share beyond that and expand its 4G LTE coverage -which it launched in 2015- due to frequent changes in management team and failing to fund the network upgrade.

In 2016, after withdrawing sanctions, RightTel associated with AT&T to provide roaming services to owners of American phones inside of Iran.

See also

MTN Irancell
Communications in Iran

References

Mobile phone companies of Iran
Privately held companies of Iran
Iranian brands
Iranian companies established in 2011
Telecommunications companies established in 2011